The 2002 Rolex 24 at Daytona was a Grand-Am Rolex Sports Car Series 24-hour endurance sports car race held on February 2–3, 2002 at the Daytona International Speedway road course. The race served as the first round of the 2002 Rolex Sports Car Series. The overall winner and winner of the SRP class was the No. 27 Doran Lista Racing Dallara SP1 driven by Didier Theys, Fredy Lienhart, Max Papis, and Mauro Baldi. The SRP II class was won by the No. 8 Rand Racing/Risi Competizione Lola B2K/40 driven by Anthony Lazzaro, Bill Rand, Terry Borcheller, and Ralf Kelleners. The GTS class was won by the No. 3 Rocketsports Racing Jaguar XKR driven by Paul Gentilozzi, Scott Pruett, Michael Lauer, and Brian Simo. The GT category was won by the No. 66 The Racer's Group Porsche 996 GT3-RS driven by Kevin Buckler, Michael Schrom, Jörg Bergmeister, and Timo Bernhard. Finally, the AGT category was won by the No. 09 Flis Racing Chevrolet Corvette driven by Craig Conway, Doug Goad, Andy Pilgrim, and Mike Ciasulli.

Race results
Class winners in bold.

External links

Official Results

Car Information & Images

24 Hours of Daytona
2002 in American motorsport
2002 in sports in Florida